Thea Flaum (born Thea Kharasch; September 17, 1938) is an American television producer best known as the creator of Sneak Previews, the movie review show featuring Roger Ebert and Gene Siskel.  She is currently the president of the Hill Foundation for Families Living with Disabilities, a non-profit organization founded by Flaum and her husband, Robert A. Hill.

Early life

Flaum was born in Chicago, Illinois.  She is the daughter of Sam and Freda Kharasch, and grew up in Chicago.  She graduated from Skidmore College in 1960, with a bachelor's degree in English literature in 2005.

Career

Television career

In 1975, Flaum created a television show called Opening Soon at a Theater Near You (later known as Sneak Previews and Sneak Previews Goes Video).

A few years later, Flaum was named Executive Producer for National (PBS) cultural programs for WTTW/Chicago.  She created the first national parenting series, “Look at Me,” hosted by Phil Donahue.  She was responsible for the “Soundstage” music series and for co-productions with MTV and HBO.

In 1984, Flaum formed an independent production company based in Chicago.  The company focused on family programming—creating, developing and producing dramas, documentaries, specials, series and pilots, for network, cable, syndication and public television.

Productions include: At the Auction, The Appraisal Fair and CityScapes for the Home and Garden Television Network (HGTV,) From Junky to Funky for DIY and De-Classified, for Tribune Broadcasting.  Also Love Hurts, a drama for ABC's AfterSchool Specials series, Christmas Every Day and The Canterville Ghost, two animated children's specials for CBS and Where’s Daddy? for NBC.  PBS shows include a record-setting series of seven Les Brown specials; Ruth Page's Die Fledermaus ballet, and Ruth Page: Once Upon A Dancer, a biographical portrait of the American dance pioneer and choreographer.

Hill Foundation for Families Living with Disabilities
Flaum is president of the Hill Foundation for Families Living with Disabilities, which was established in 2007 by Flaum and her husband, Robert A. Hill.

The foundation has created FacingDisability.com, a web resource specifically created to connect families who suddenly have to deal with a spinal cord injury with people like them.

Community service
Flaum currently serves as a member of the Boards of Trustees of Access Living, the Chicago Television Academy, the Ruth Page Foundation, the Fund for Innovative Television and the Governing Board of the Chicago Symphony.

Personal life
Flaum is married to Chicago businessman, Robert A. Hill, the founder and chairman of Floor Covering Associates. They have four children, Jonathan and Alison Flaum and Vicki and Miranda Hill.

Filmography

Awards

Flaum has won nine Emmy Awards, 10 international film awards, the American Bar Association's “Silver Gavel” award, the “Best in Media” award from the National Council for Children's Rights, a Cine “Golden Eagle,” and a “Golden Apple.”  In 1993, she was named Chicago's “Best Producer” by “Screen” Magazine.  In 1996, she received the Governor's Award from the Chicago Academy of Television Arts and Sciences. In 2001, she received their Silver Circle Award for her “significant contributions to broadcasting”.  She was given the Focus Achievement Award from Women in Film Chicago in 2006.  She also served as National Vice-President of the National Academy of Television Arts and Sciences.

References

External links

American television producers
American women television producers
1938 births
Living people
21st-century American women